Chris Camden (born 28 May 1963) is an English footballer, who played as a forward in the Football League for Chester City and Tranmere Rovers.

Biography
He also worked full-time for 37 years for Vauxhall Motors at Ellesmere Port. On 8 May 1987, he went to work as usual in the morning, was sent home and then played for Tranmere against Exeter.

He spent many years playing in non league football with the likes of Macclesfield Town, Stafford Rangers, Cheltenham Town as well as a spell in the Welsh League with Conwy United. At Stafford, he scored 36 goals in one season to win the Golden Boot.

References

1963 births
Living people
Sportspeople from Birkenhead
Association football forwards
English footballers
Chester City F.C. players
Oswestry Town F.C. players
Tranmere Rovers F.C. players
Ellesmere Port & Neston F.C. players
South Liverpool F.C. players
Stafford Rangers F.C. players
Macclesfield Town F.C. players
Leek Town F.C. players
Cheltenham Town F.C. players
Stalybridge Celtic F.C. players
Marine F.C. players
Conwy Borough F.C. players
English Football League players
Cymru Premier players